Tạ, sometimes anglicized as Ta, is a Vietnamese surname of Han Chinese origin. It is the Vietnamese variation of the Chinese surname Xie (謝).

Vietnamese Chinese whose ancestors migrated from South China to Vietnam have this surname as they were forced to adopt a Vietnamese surname.  The Chinese surname 謝 translates as "thank"; the word "tạ" also means "thank you" in Vietnamese, and was therefore adopted by ethnic Chinese as a calque of the Chinese surname.

Other diasporic variations if the surname Xie (the Pinyin spelling in Standard Mandarin) include:

 Hsieh (Mandarin, in Wade-Giles)
 Tse, Tze, Che, Jay (Cantonese)
 Chia, Cheah, Sia (Hokkien)
 Chia (Teochew)
 Zhia, Zia (Shanghainese)
 Sa (Korean)

Notable Vietnamese people with the surname include:
Tạ Chí Đại Trường (1939-2016), Vietnamese historian 
Ta Mok (1926–2006), Cambodian military leader
Tạ Phong Tần (born 1968), Vietnamese dissident 
Tạ Thu Thâu (1906–1945), Vietnamese politician
Tạ Tỵ (1922–2004), Vietnamese painter
Tạ Văn Phụng (died 1865), Vietnamese nobleman

See also
Xie (surname)

Vietnamese-language surnames